Vesper Buick was a U.S. soccer team established in 1922 in St. Louis, Missouri.  The team played in the St. Louis Soccer League, winning two league titles and losing the 1924 National Challenge Cup.  The team changed sponsorship in 1926, becoming White Banner.

History
Vesper Buick was sponsored by the Vesper Buick company for its four seasons.  When it entered the St. Louis Soccer League in 1922, it quickly rose to dominance, winning the league title.  It repeated as champion the next season, before finishing second the next two seasons.  On May 30, 1924, Vesper Buick fell to the Fall River Marksmen of the American Soccer League in the National Challenge Cup.  The game, won 4-2 by the Marksmen, was played in St. Louis at the High School Field.

Record

References

External links
 St. Louis Soccer League standings

Association football clubs established in 1922
Defunct soccer clubs in Missouri
Vesper Buick
Vesper Buick
1922 establishments in Missouri